The Morrison–Grady Plan, also known as the Morrison Plan or the Provincial Autonomy Plan was a joint Anglo-American plan announced on 31 July 1946 for the creation of a unitary federal trusteeship in Mandatory Palestine.

Following the issuance of the Anglo-American Committee of Inquiry report on 20 April 1946, a new committee was created to establish how the Anglo-American proposals would be implemented, led by British Deputy Prime Minister Herbert Morrison and US diplomat Henry F. Grady. Morrison presented the plan to the British Parliament on 31 July 1946. In the United States, President Truman's initial support for the plan changed after American Zionist lobbying against it before the November mid-term elections. The pressure from American Zionists resulted in President Truman rejecting the plan, despite it having been proposed by Truman's own appointee. The United States then had no Palestine policy.

The plan became the point of departure for the London Conference of 1946–47, convened by the British on 1 October 1946.

Details

Under the terms of the plan, Jewish and Arab provinces would exercise self-rule under British oversight, and Jerusalem and the Negev would remain under direct British control.

Reactions
The Arab states discussed the plan with the British at the London Conference of 1946–47, rejected the plan on the grounds that it would lead to partition and instead proposed an independent unitary state.
 
The Jews refused to attend the conference since they had rejected the provisional autonomy plan at a separate Zionist conference. They made attendance conditioned on having their detained leaders released to represent them at the table, which the British did not permit.

At a later meeting of the Conference the following February, Britain proposed a plan, known as the Bevin Plan, for a five-year British trusteeship. The trusteeship was to lead to a permanent settlement agreed by all parties. When both the Arabs and the Jews rejected the plan, Britain decided to refer the problem to the United Nations, which set up the United Nations Special Committee on Palestine.

Negev settlement
In response to the plan, the Jewish Agency decided to settle the Negev in a scheme known as the 11 points in the Negev.

References

Bibliography
 H. Levenberg, "Bevin's Disillusionment: The London Conference, Autumn 1946", Middle Eastern Studies, Vol. 27, No. 4 (October 1991), pp. 615–630

External links
 US Department of State (1946) Foreign Relations of the United States: Diplomatic Papers, 1946, Volume VII: The Near East and Africa. Washington, DC: Government Printing Office, pp. 652–667

1946 in international relations
Documents of Mandatory Palestine